Irén Pavlics (15 November 1934 – 2 February 2022) was a Hungarian Slovene author and editor.

Pavlics was born in the village of Rábatótfalu (today the suburb of Szentgotthárd), Hungary, in 1934. She graduated from Szeged and by 1972 was a mistress in Apátistvánfalva. By 1990 she was an arch-lecturer for the Democratic League of South Slavs in Hungary. In 1990 she became a secretary for the League of Hungarian Slovenes. She wrote articles in Slovene in the Narodne Novine, Narodni kalendar. In 1986 she wrote the Slovenski koledar, in 1990 in the newspaper Porabje.

She died in Budapest on 2 February 2022, at the age of 87.

Works 
 Manjšinski zakon na Madžarskem
 Moji spomini na Števanovce

See also 
 List of Slovene writers and poets in Hungary

References 

 Enciklopedija Slovenije; zvezek 8, Mladinska knjiga, Ljubljana, 1994
 Marija Kozar/Kozár Mária: Etnološki Slovar Slovencev na Madžarskem/A Magyarországi Szlovének Néprajzi Szótára, Monošter-Szombathely 1996. 
 Franci Just: Porabje, Franc-Franc, Murska Sobota 2009. 
 Mária Mukics: A Magyarországi Szlovének, Press Publica, Budapest 2003. 
 Franci Just: Besede iz Porabja, besede za Porabja, Franc-Franc, Murska Sobota 2003. 

1934 births
2022 deaths
Slovenian writers and poets in Hungary
People from Szentgotthárd